The 2010–11 All-Ireland Senior Club Hurling Championship was the 41st staging of Ireland's premier competition at inter-county level for hurling clubs.  A total of fifteen teams competed in the championship, with Clarinbridge defeating O'Loughlin Gaels by 2-18 to 0-12 in the final at Croke Park, Dublin.

The championship began on 10 October 2010 and concluded on 17 March 2011.

Pre-championship

Barring a win for Loughgiel Shamrocks, a new club will be crowned All-Ireland champions on St. Patricks's Day as the remaining participants have never claimed the championship title.  The Shamrocks claimed the championship in 1982–83, however, their campaign is expected to end in the All-Ireland semi-final.  The dominant teams of the last few years – Ballyhale Shamrocks, Birr, Portumna and Newtownshandrum – were all eliminated in their respective county club championships.  Of all the participating clubs both Kilmallock and De La Salle are the only two teams to have ended up as All-Ireland runners-up in the past without claiming the title.

Oulart-the-Ballagh were installed as favourites to bring the title back to Wexford for the first time since Buffer's Alley success in 1988–89.  Thurles Sarsfield's and O'Loughlin Gaels were also regarded as potential All-Ireland champions.

The championship

Participating clubs

Format

The 2010–11 club championship will be played on a provincial basis as usual.  It will be a knockout tournament with pairings drawn at random in the respective provinces – there will be no seeds.

Each match will be played as a single leg. If a match is drawn there will be a replay.  If that match ends in a draw a period of extra time will be played, however, if both sides are still level at the end of extra time another replay will take place.

Leinster Championship

Quarter-finals: (2 matches) These are two lone matches between the first four teams drawn from the province of Leinster.

Semi-finals: (2 matches) The winners of the two quarter-finals join the other two Munster teams to make up the semi-final pairings.

Final: (1 match) The winners of the two semi-finals contest this game.

Munster Championship

Quarter-final: (1 match) This is a single match between the first two teams drawn from the province of Munster.

Semi-finals: (2 matches) The winner of the lone quarter-final joins the other three Munster teams to make up the semi-final pairings.

Final: (1 match) The winners of the two semi-finals contest this game.

Ulster Championship

Semi-finals: (2 matches) The four participating Ulster clubs are drawn against each other to make up the semi-final pairings.

Final: (1 match) The winners of the two semi-finals contest this game.

All-Ireland Series

Semi-finals: (2 matches) The four provincial champions contest these games.

Final: (1 match) The two semi-final winners contest the final.

Fixtures

Leinster Senior Club Hurling Championship

Munster Senior Club Hurling Championship

Ulster Senior Club Hurling Championship

All-Ireland Senior Club Hurling Championship

Championship statistics

Scoring

 First goal of the championship: 10 October 2010 - Kevin O'Neill for Lavey against Keady Lámh Dhearg (Ulster semi-final)
 Widest winning margin: 24 points
 Loughgiel Shamrocks 2–24 – 0–6 Keady Lámh Dhearg (Ulster final)
Most goals in a match: 8 goals
Oulart-the-Ballagh 4–11 : 4–8 Raharney (Leinster semi-final)
Most goals scored in one half by a single team: 4 goals - Raharney against Oulart-the-Ballagh (Leinster semi-final)
Most goals scored by losing team: 4 goals
Raharney 4–8 : 4–11 Oulart-the-Ballagh (Leinster semi-final)

Discipline

 First red card of the championship: 10 October 2010 - Philip Kirk for Lavey against Keady Lámh Dhearg (Ulster semi-final)

Miscellaneous

 Crusheen, the county champions of Clare, participated in the championship for the very first time in the history of the competition.
 For the first time ever a club from Armagh – Keady Lámh Dhearg – qualified for the Ulster final.  That game turned into the most one-sided decider in the history of the championship as Loughgiel Shamrocks won by twenty-four points.
 Thurles Sarsfields qualified for the Munster final for the very first time in their history.
 The Leinster final between O'Loughlin Gaels and Oulart-the-Ballagh, originally fixed for 28 November, was postponed due to a heavy snowfall and freezing temperatures across the country.
 Referee John Sexton took charge of the Munster final just twenty-four hours after his father Johnny's funeral.  The Ballyhea whistler had the sad duty of having to blow the whistle to start and end the minute's silence in memory of his late father before the throw-in.
 A mere 1,613 people attended the Munster final as the country was gripped by a sudden cold spell.  It is believed that this is the lowest attendance ever recorded at a Munster decider.

Top scorers

Overall

Single game

References

2010 in hurling
2011 in hurling
All-Ireland Senior Club Hurling Championship